The Musée Édith Piaf is a private museum dedicated to singer Édith Piaf located in the 11th arrondissement at 5, rue Crespin du Gast, Paris, France. It is open by appointment; admission is free.

The museum was created by Bernard Marchois, author of two Piaf biographies, and occupies two rooms within a private apartment. It contains memorabilia including her china collection, gold and platinum records, dress and shoes, photographs, fan letters, sheet music, posters, and recordings.

See also 
 List of museums in Paris
 List of music museums

References 

 Paris Convention & Visitors Bureau entry
 Kristan Lawson and Anneli S. Rufus, Weird Europe: A Guide to Bizarre, Macabre, and Just Plain Weird Sights, Macmillan, 1999, page 67. .
 Travel Signposts description
 Frommers article

Museums in Paris
Buildings and structures in the 11th arrondissement of Paris
Music museums in France
Piaf
Édith Piaf